WITO (1230 AM) is a commercial radio station serving the Ironton, Ohio, Flatwoods, Kentucky, Ashland, Kentucky, and Huntington, West Virginia, areas.

The station's antenna system uses a single tower that results in an omnidirectional signal pattern. The transmitter and broadcast tower are located near the intersection of U.S. Route 52 and Ohio State Route 93 in Ironton.

The station had the call letters WIRO from 1951 to 2022.

History
WIRO was signed on in September 1951 by Iron City Broadcasting with C.A. Baker as president. The station was purchased in February 1962 by Tri-Radio Broadcasting. The station remained Adult Contemporary for majority of the ownership under Tri-Radio until it was sold in 1995 to Adventure Radio for $300,000. This was the first time not only did WIRO exit local ownership, it was separated from its FM sister station and vacated the Ironton studios and merged with the new co-owned radio stations in Huntington. Adventure Radio sold their Huntington West Virginia stations, which included WIRO to Commodore Media in 1997. Commodore would be sold to Atlantic Star in 1996 for $200 million. Chancellor Media, of which Atlantic Star was a subsidiary, became AMFM and was acquired by Clear Channel in a deal announced October 3, 1999, and valued at $17.4 billion.

In December 2021, iHeart donated WIRO to KW Ministries; the donation was consummated on February 28, 2022. It was also the last remaining station for the Aloha Station Trust that has been held since 2007.

References

External links

Ironton, Ohio
ITO
Radio stations established in 1951
1951 establishments in Ohio